Year 9 is an educational year group in schools in many countries including England and Wales, Australia and New Zealand. It is the tenth or eleventh year of compulsory education.

Australia
In Australia, Year 9 is usually the tenth year of compulsory education. Although there are slight variations between the states, most children in Year 9 are aged between fourteen and fifteen.

New Zealand
In New Zealand, Year 9 is the tenth year of compulsory education, and the first year of secondary education. Children entering Year Ten are generally aged between 12.5 and 14. Year 9 pupils are educated in secondary schools or area schools.

United Kingdom
In England and Wales, Year 9 is the ninth year after Reception. It is the ninth full year of compulsory education, with children being admitted who are aged 13 before 1 September in any given academic year.  It is also the year in which pupils are formally assessed against National Curriculum levels. With effect from 2009, National Curriculum Tests are no longer compulsory in this year group.
Year 9 is usually the third year of Secondary school and was previously known as the 'third year' or 'third form'. Some schools in the UK (especially grammar schools and private schools) still refer to 'year 9' as 'third year'. In most schools in England and Wales, it is also the final year of Key Stage 3. Pupils usually either choose or start their options for their GCSE qualifications in Year 9. 

In Scotland, Year 9 is the equivalent to Second year (S2) where pupils start at the age of 12 or 13 and end the at the age of 13 or 14. In Second year pupils pick subjects for Third year.

In Northern Ireland, Year 9 is the second year of Secondary education. Children in Year 9 are aged between 12 and 13. It is the second year of Key Stage 3.

References

9